Caguana is a barrio in the municipality of Utuado, Puerto Rico. Its population in 2010 was 4,009.

Geography

History
It is one of the few municipalities of Puerto Rico to have an ancient area for Mesoamerican ballgames, called Batéy games, in the Caribbean. The Caguana Ceremonial Ball Courts Site in Utuado preserves the site where the Taíno people lived. The Tanamá River goes through Caguana, Utuado.

Puerto Rico was ceded by Spain in the aftermath of the Spanish–American War under the terms of the Treaty of Paris of 1898 and became an unincorporated territory of the United States. In 1899, the United States Department of War conducted a census of Puerto Rico finding that the population of Caguana barrio was 2,555.

Gallery

See also

 List of communities in Puerto Rico

References

Barrios of Utuado, Puerto Rico